Indiana's 1st congressional district is an electoral district for the U.S. Congress in Northwestern Indiana. The district is based in Gary and its surrounding suburbs and exurbs. It consists of all of Lake and Porter counties, as well as most of the western part La Porte County, on the border with Michigan. Redistricting passed by the Indiana General Assembly in 2011 shifted the district's boundaries, effective January 2013, to include all of Lake and Porter counties and the western and northwestern townships of La Porte County, while moving Benton, Jasper and Newton counties out of the district.

The district is currently represented by Democrat Frank J. Mrvan. He was sworn in on January 3, 2021.

The district's character is very different from the rest of Indiana.  It includes almost all of the Indiana side of the Chicago metropolitan area.  While Porter and LaPorte are swing counties, Lake County is heavily Democratic. Lake County contains two-thirds of the district's population, which is enough to make the 1st a relatively safe Democratic seat. The district has not elected a Republican to Congress in 94 years, making it one of the longest continuously Democratic districts in the nation. Among Indiana's congressional districts, only the Indianapolis-based 7th District is more Democratic.

Election results from presidential races

List of members representing the district

Composition 

 91 LaPorte County exists in both the 1st and 2nd Congressional districts. One city, La Porte, exists in the 1st and 2nd congressional districts, and two cities, Michigan City and New Durham, exist in the 1st congressional district. Five townships, Clinton, Clinton, Dewey, New Durham, and Springfield exists in the 1st congressional district, and eleven townships, Hanna, Hudson, Johnson, Lincoln, Noble, Pleasant, Prairie, Scipio, Union, Washington, and Wills exist in the 2nd congressional district.

As of 2021, Indiana's 1st congressional district is composed of Lake (pop. 496,005) and Porter (pop. 164,343) counties as well as part of LaPorte County (pop. 111,467), which is also partly within Indiana's 2nd district. Michigan City and five townships (Clinton, Coolspring, Dewey, New Durham, and Springfield) exist entirely in the 1st district. La Porte and eleven townships (Hanna, Hudson, Johnson, Lincoln, Noble, Pleasant, Prairie, Scipio, Union, Washington, and Wills) are split between the 1st and 2nd districts by Indiana West 500N and Indiana South/North 600W.

Cities of 10,000 or more people
 Hammond - 80,830
 Gary - 80,294
 Portage - 36,828
 Valparaiso - 31,730
 Michigan City - 31,479
 Crown Point - 27,317
 East Chicago - 29,698
 Hobart - 29,059
 Lake Station - 12,572

Towns of 10,000 or more people
 Cedar Lake - 11,560
 Dyer - 16,390
 Griffith - 16,893
 Highland - 23,727
 Merrillville - 35,246
 Munster - 23,603
 Schererville - 29,243
 St. John-14,850
 Chesterton - 13,068

2,500 - 10,000 people
 Lowell - 9,276
 Winfield - 4,383
 Hebron - 3,724
 Porter - 4,858
 Westville - 5,853
 Whiting - 4,997

Election results

\

2002

2004

2006

2008

2010

Recent elections

2012

2014

2016

2018

2020

2022

See also

Indiana's congressional districts
List of United States congressional districts

Notes

References

 Congressional Biographical Directory of the United States 1774–present

External links
 Congressman Pete Visclosky official U.S. House website

01
Benton County, Indiana
Jasper County, Indiana
Lake County, Indiana
Newton County, Indiana
Porter County, Indiana
Constituencies established in 1823
1823 establishments in Indiana